Andreas Schilling (born 25 May 1991) is a Danish triathlete. He competed in the men's event at the 2016 Summer Olympics. He is the winner of the 2018 ITU Duathlon World Championships.

References

External links
 

1991 births
Living people
Danish male triathletes
Olympic triathletes of Denmark
Triathletes at the 2016 Summer Olympics
People from Fredericia
Sportspeople from the Region of Southern Denmark